Robert Zildjian (July 14, 1923 – March 28, 2013) was the founder of Sabian Cymbals, the second-largest manufacturer of cymbals in the world.

Career 
Zildjian was born in Boston, Massachusetts, and belonged to the Zildjian family, which brought the technology of cymbal production to the United States by Armenian Avedis Zildjian, and then passed it on to future generations of family members. The company was founded in 1981 in Meductic, New Brunswick, Canada, by Robert Zildjian, son of Avedis Zildjian III, the head of the Avedis Zildjian Company located in Quincy, Massachusetts. Family tradition had it that the head of the company would pass its secrets down only to the oldest son, but Avedis III gave the information to both his sons, Armand Zildjian and Robert Zildjian. A family feud resulted in Robert leaving Zildjian to form the rival Sabian Cymbals company. Robert Zildjian said, "It got to the point where they were taking away certain parts of my job. I was the export man. I was the advertising. I was the marketing. I was quite a few things. All of a sudden, I was bereft of all that." The companies continue to be rivals, and are both among the world's most popular cymbal brands. Sabian cymbals have been used by many famous drummers in the world, including Phil Collins, Tony Royster Jr. (Jay Z), Chad Smith of the Red Hot Chili Peppers, Neil Peart of Rush, and Mike Portnoy, formerly of Dream Theater. Zildjian remained active in management until recently, spending most of the summer in a cottage in Meductic, New Brunswick, near the main production facility.

Zildjian formed the word Sabian from the two first letters of the names of his three children Sally, Bill and Andy (a nickname for Armand) and "-ian" (indicating Armenian descent).

Death 
Zildjian died from cancer on March 28, 2013, at his home in Brunswick, Maine, at the age of 89. In addition to his wife Willi, sons Andy and Wilson (Bill), and daughter Sally Zildjian-Teague, he was survived by eight grandchildren.

References

External links
 Official website of Sabian
 Zildjian at the ArmeniaPedia

1923 births
2013 deaths
American musical instrument makers
American people of Armenian descent
Deaths from cancer in Maine
American expatriates in Canada
Businesspeople from Boston
People from Brunswick, Maine
Deaths from skin cancer
20th-century American businesspeople